Herochroma clariscripta is a moth of the family Geometridae first described by Jeremy Daniel Holloway in 1996. It is found on Borneo.

The wingspan is 20–28 mm for males and about 23 mm for females.

References

Moths described in 1996
Pseudoterpnini
Moths of Borneo